Ulloor S. Parameswara Iyer was one of the modern triumvirate poets of Malayalam poetry. There are two major annual literary awards instituted in his memory, both known by the name Ulloor Award. 

The older among the two awards was instituted by Mahakavi Ulloor Memorial Library and Research Institute and presented at Ulloor Memorial in Jagathy, Trivandrum coinciding with the birth anniversary of the poet. The award is given in two categories: Ulloor Literary Award is given to poetry collections published in the last three years as first edition in Malayalam–language and Ulloor Endowment Award is given for the best critical work on the poet. The literary award carries 10,000 and a citation, and the endowment carries 5,000 and a citation.

The other award was instituted in 2017 by Ulloor Service Cooperative Bank.

Recipients of Ulloor Award instituted by Ulloor Memorial Library and Research Institute

Award for poetry

Endowment Award

Recipients of award instituted by Ulloor Service Cooperative Bank

References

Indian literary awards
Awards established in 2009
Malayalam literary awards
2009 establishments in Kerala
Kerala awards